The genus Nosoderma includes 28 species of ironclad beetles from the Americas, including some common and widely distributed species placed in the former genus Phloeodes.

References

Zopheridae